Broad Oak or Broadoak may refer to one of several places in Great Britain or the United States:

England

 Broadoak, Cornwall, England
 Broad Oak, Cumbria, England

Broad Oak, Rother, East Sussex, England
Broad Oak, Wealden, East Sussex, England
 Broad Oak, Kent, England

 Broad Oak, Herefordshire, England
 Broad Oak, St Helens, England

United States
Broad Oak (Dedham), an estate in Dedham, Massachusetts

Other
 Hatfield Broad Oak, England
 Broadoak Academy, Somerset, England
 Broadoak School, Greater Manchester, England
 The Edward Harden Mansion in Sleepy Hollow, New York, United States, was originally known as Broad Oaks
 Broad Oak and Thornhill Meadows